Coktel Vision (also known as Coktel and Coktel Studio) was a French video game developer and publisher based in Paris. It was best known for its educational and adventure games.

History 
Coktel Vision was founded in 1984 by Roland Oskian, an engineer and a former executive at Matra Espace. The French gaming market was still developing at the time, the company consisted of only several people who worked from Oskian's house, with Roland acting as a director and composer and his wife Catherine creating graphics and cover art.

Coktel made its name by publishing simulation, action and narrative-driven adventure titles for the Thomson and Amstrad CPC computers. Their catalogue included both original and licensed games often based on Franco-Belgian comics such as Asterix, Lucky Luke and Blueberry. They saw a quick growth and in several years entered the edutainment market, while also starting to port their games to PC and Macintosh.

In 1986, Muriel Tramis joined Coktel Vision. Known as the first female French video game designer, she quickly turned into the studios' leading talent, developing some of its best-selling games and gaining the informal title of "Roberta Williams of France". Tramis often explored political and social themes novel for its time such as imperialism, slavery and eroticism, collaborating with the créolité writer Patrick Chamoiseau. Yet her name is usually associated with more family-friendly series like Gobliiins co-created with Pierre Gilhodes and Adibou, the long-running commercially successful educational games that had sold over 1.5 million copies by 1997.

Tramis described Coktel Vision as a diverse company with a "start-up atmosphere" that allowed plenty of freedom to its designers. During the early 1990s Coktel experimented with various formats such as 3D and FMV and enjoyed continued strong growth: in 1993 it made 75 million francs against 30 million in 1992, with the Adibou series covering 65% of the French edutainment market and 35% of the European market. By 1996 those numbers increased up to 75% in France.

In 1992, the company was acquired by the American publisher Sierra On-Line (the deal was finalised on 29 October 1993). Ken Williams later said that Sierra was more interested in expanding its European educational sales than in Coktel's games. As part of the deal, Sierra published popular French titles worldwide while Coktel localised and published Sierra's games through its Tomahawk publishing label. In 1996 after Urban Runner became a commercial failure the company decided to focus on educational titles rather than adventure games.

In February 1996, Sierra along with its subsidiaries was acquired by CUC International, with Coktel becoming part of CUC's new CUC Software branch. CUC was then merged with HFS Incorporated into Cendant and in 1998 sold its software branch to the French publisher Havas, which was acquired by Vivendi. Coktel continued producing edutainment titles, focusing on the European market only; in 1999 Roland Oskian left the company, and in 2003 he was followed by Muriel Tramis after the new management decided to subcontract some of the major Coktel's titles.

In October 2005, Coktel Vision was sold to French publisher Mindscape, wherein eleven Coktel employees were absorbed into Mindscape. Mindscape retained the Coktel brand until closing in 2011.

Subsidiaries 
 MDO – a Bordeaux-based company which did all the programming. Named after its three founders: Mathieu Marciacq, Arnaud Delrue and Roland Oskian.
 Tomahawk – presented as a subsidiary, it was only a label that Coktel Vision used to publish simulation and erotic games to distance themselves from edutainment titles.

Games published

References

External links 

 

 
Sierra Entertainment
Video game companies established in 1984
Video game companies disestablished in 2005
Defunct video game companies of France
Video game development companies